The Journey Within is the debut album by Bernie Williams, who at the time of its release was still an outfielder for the New York Yankees. Released on July 15, 2003, by GRP Records, Williams played both lead and rhythm guitar on the album and composed seven of the album's songs. The album peaked at number 151 on the Billboard 200 and number 3 on the Top Contemporary Jazz albums chart.

Marketing
The album's label, GRP, hoping to capitalize on Williams's popularity as a baseball player, released the album to coincide with the 2003 Major League Baseball All-Star Game. They also organized a Bernie Williams CD night at Yankee Stadium and distributed a sampler CD with proof of purchase of Kraft products.

Track listing
"La Salsa en Mi" (Bernie Williams)-4:37
"The Way" (John DeNicola, Patti Maloney)-5:14
"Para Don Berna" (Bernie Williams)-3:23
"Desvelado" (Bernie Williams)-5:30
"Just Because" (Bernie Williams)-6:16
"Samba Novo" (Bernie Williams)-1:46
"Dust in the Wind" (Kerry Livgren)-3:28
"Stranded on the Bridge" (Bernie Williams)-4:43
"Bernie Jr." (Bernie Williams)-6:13
"Enter the Bond" (Bernie Williams)-5:03
"And So It Goes" (Billy Joel)-3:46
"Just Because" [Radio Mix] (Bernie Williams)-3:49
"The Williams Kids"-4:27

Personnel
Credits adapted from album's liner notes.

Musicians
Bernie Williams - lead guitar, rhythm guitar (1, 3-5, 8-10, 12), additional percussion (4, 10)
Mike Alvarez - additional guitar (track 10)
Kenny Aronoff - drums (tracks 1, 2, 5, 10, 12)
David Benoit - additional piano (track 12)
Rubén Blades - background vocals (track 1)
Luis Conte - percussion (tracks 1, 2, 5, 12)
Béla Fleck - banjo (tracks 1, 8)
Jerry Hey - additional flugelhorn (track 12)
Bashiri Johnson - percussion (tracks 3, 4, 8-10)
B.J. Lequerica - background vocals (track 2)
Shawn Pelton - drums (tracks 4, 8, 9)
Tim Pierce - rhythm guitar (tracks 1, 2, 5, 7, 10, 12), lead guitar (10)
Mark Rivera - saxophone (tracks 1, 2, 8, 9)
David Sancious - keyboards (tracks 3, 4, 8, 9)
Gilberto Santa Rosa - background vocals (track 1)
Leland Sklar- bass (tracks 1, 2, 5, 10, 12)
David Spinozza - rhythm guitar (tracks 3, 4, 8, 9)
John Thomas - keyboards (tracks 1, 2, 5, 10, 12), piano and strings (11)
Hiram Williams - cello (tracks 3, 7)
Larry Williams - Fender rhodes (track 12)
T-Bone Wolk - bass (tracks 4, 8, 9), acoustic bass (3)

Production
Lorren Harriet - producer
Tally Sherwood - engineer (tracks 1, 2, 5, 7, 10-12)
Danny Bernini - engineer (tracks 3, 4, 6-11)
Mike Alvarez - additional engineering (tracks 1, 4)
Paul Brown - remixing
Bud Harner - remixing
Stephen Marcussen - mastering
Hollis King - art direction
LeRoy Neiman - paintings
Jorge Alvarez - photography, back cover
Kelly Pratt - release coordinator
Robert Silverberg - release coordinator
Bernie Williams - liner notes
Paul McCartney - liner notes

Charts
The Journey Within charted on several Billboard lists:

References

External links
 

2003 debut albums
Bernie Williams albums
GRP Records albums